Clayton is a town and county seat of Union County, New Mexico, United States. As of the 2010 census, the city population was 2,980.

History

Early History

Native Americans were present in the area of Clayton for at least 10,000 years, as evidenced by the findings at the Folsom site about 55 miles northwest of Clayton, near the village of Folsom. Later the area was part of Comancheria.

The Cimarron Cutoff of the Santa Fe Trail brought some of the first Americans through the Clayton region. The Santa Fe Trail was first established in 1821 after Spanish rule was evicted from Mexico which opened up trade between Santa Fe and the United States. William Becknell, also known as the Father of the Santa Fe Trail, became the first person to utilize the Santa Fe Trail as a trade route between the state of Missouri and Santa Fe. He established the Cimarron Cutoff, also known as the Cimarron Route, as a faster route between countries as the Cimarron Route shortened the Trail by more than 100 miles. The Cimarron Cutoff went straight through the Clayton region where travelers used the Rabbit Ear Mountain as a guiding landmark. Eventually travelers along the trail began to appreciate the rich soil around Clayton and the rolling green hills which were perfect for raising livestock. 

The Goodnight-Loving Trail also passed through the area (bringing cattle north from Texas) starting in the late 1860s,  but eventually cattle ranchers and sheepherders established ranches in the Clayton area itself, though they were large and far apart. That changed when the Fort Worth and Denver City Railroad came to the area in 1888 and Stephen Dorsey, a nearby rancher, received the rights to the area where the railroad ran. He soon laid out a town site.

In 1892, the saloon of what would later become the Hotel Eklund was built, and by 1894 the saloon featured a front and back bar, pool and carom tables, monte game tables, a crap table, and a poker table. By 1898, the building was further expanded to add a hotel.

Clayton is named for a son of U.S. Senator Stephen W. Dorsey, an Arkansas Republican, originally from Ohio, who served during Reconstruction. The town was established in 1887. The town was a livestock shipping center for herds from the Pecos River and the Texas Panhandle.

Twentieth Century

US President Theodore Roosevelt visited Clayton on April 14, 1905.

In 1928 the main street of Clayton was paved and street lighting was added.

Clayton and the rest of Northeastern New Mexico was hit hard by the Dust Bowl of the 1930s; however, the era was also a time of renewal and rebuilding in the community, in large part due to the work of the Works Project Administration in the community.

Clayton was hit by a "black roller" (giant dust cloud) that measured 1500 feet high and a mile across on May 28, 1937.

In 1999, the dining room and saloon of the old Eklund Hotel was reopened.

Twenty-first century

The Eklund hotel reopened on July 3, 2011.

Geography
Clayton is considered to be in the Plains region of New Mexico. This region stretches to the Sangre de Cristo Mountains down to the Guadalupe Mountains. Clayton is also located near two parks, Clayton Lake State Park, and Capulin Volcano National Monument. Not far away is Black Mesa State Park in Oklahoma. A carbon dioxide field called Bravo Dome can be found near Clayton and stretches nearly 1 million acres.

Climate
Clayton has a typical New Mexico cool semi-arid climate (Köppen BSk) with hot summers and cool, dry winters. Winter weather can vary greatly from warm and windy due to the influence of the chinook, to frigid and snowy when Arctic air moved southward from Canada.

Notes

Demographics 

As of the census of 2010, there were 2,980 people, 1,025 households (only 77.8% of the population was living in households), and 623 family households residing in the town. The population density was 535.7 people per square mile (206.9/km). There were 1,289 housing units at an average density of 273.6 per square mile (105.7/km). The racial makeup of the town was 75.9% White (43.5% non-Hispanic white), 2.7% Native American, 2.6% black or African American, 0.5% Asian, 15.6% from some other races, and 2.6% from two or more races. Hispanic or Latino of any race were 51.1% of the population.

As of the 2000 census, there were 1,079 households, out of which 30.5% had children under the age of 18 living with them, 47.6% were married couples living together, 11.7% had a female householder with no husband present, and 35.9% were non-families. 33.7% of all households were made up of individuals, and 18.2% had someone living alone who was 65 years of age or older. The average household size was 2.32 and the average family size was 2.99.

In the town, the population was spread out, with 27.7% under the age of 18, 6.3% from 18 to 24, 23.8% from 25 to 44, 23.6% from 45 to 64, and 18.7% who were 65 years of age or older. The median age was 40 years. For every 100 females, there were 95.7 males. For every 100 females age 18 and over, there were 92.4 males.

The median income for a household in the town was $25,600, and the median income for a family was $30,109. Males had a median income of $26,554 versus $17,054 for females. The per capita income for the town was $13,967. About 14.2% of families and 17.9% of the population were below the poverty line, including 31.4% of those under age 18 and 9.1% of those age 65 or over.

Economy
Clayton has a rich history of commerce dating back to its founding in the 1800s. The railroad and nearby ranches caused Clayton to become a major livestock shipping center. A Dr. Pepper bottling plant was in town for a short time before moving back out. The town still thrives as a ranching and farming community, but has expanded its commerce to include multiple eating establishments, numerous shops, several dollar stores, two convenience stores, and multiple motels and campgrounds. The Ranch Market is the town's grocery store which has served the community faithfully for many years. Main Street and First Street are lined with shops including two flower stores and the town's western wear store: Ropes Western Wear and Casual. The town still maintains its small-town, country charm as the historic Hotel Eklund and the Luna Theater have been in operation for more than one hundred years, standing as a reminder to the town's earlier, simpler days.

Community
Clayton holds a parade each Independence Day. The Herzstein Memorial Museum, run by the Union County Historical Society, is open without charge Tuesdays through Saturdays and by appointment. An official interpretative center of the Santa Fe Trail, the Herzstein focuses upon county and regional history.

One of the oldest movie theaters in America stands in Clayton. Opened in 1916 as The Mission Theater, the Luna Theater is still in operation today, showing a different movie each weekend. “The Mission style exterior, and the interior, with its Art Deco style touches, has been painstakingly restored and refurbished over the years, including all new projection equipment.”  Although refurbished, much of the design is original, with original seating, light fixtures, and ticket booth. "Morris Herzstein built the theater and adjacent business block in 1916 after a disastrous fire wiped out his headquarters mercantile store... Before the Great Depression, the Mission Theater flourished and provided the magic of movies in Clayton, including memorable Christmas matinees offered free to children where Santa Claus would appear and give small presents to the crowd.”  In 1935, T.F. Murphy bought the Mission Theater, renamed it the Luna Theater, and added some renovations. The Luna Theater is one of the most historic theaters in the country, landing a special place on the National Register of Historic Places in 2007.

Transportation
Highway connections include US Route 412 and US Route 64 concurrently through town running generally southwest to northeast, as well as US Route 87 running generally northwest to southeast.
  
Clayton Municipal Airpark two miles east of town (KCAO, or FAA Identifier CAO), opened in December of 1946, and features two runways the longer of which is 6307 x 75 feet (1922 x 23 meters). Currently there is no scheduled passenger service.

Railroad freight service is provided by BNSF. Passenger service ceased on September 11, 1967.

Gallery

See also

Rabbit Ears

References

External links

 Clayton (archived) 
 Welcome to Clayton NM 

County seats in New Mexico
Towns in New Mexico
Towns in Union County, New Mexico
Populated places established in 1887
1887 establishments in New Mexico Territory